The AK-103 is a Russian assault rifle designed by small arms designer Mikhail Kalashnikov.

History 
The AK-103 was officially offered for export in March 1993.

Design details

It is an AK-100 derivative of the AK-74M that is chambered for the 7.62x39mm M43 cartridge, similar to the AKM. The AK-103 can be fitted with a variety of sights, including night vision and telescopic sights, plus a knife-bayonet or a grenade launcher like the GP-34. Newer versions can fit Picatinny rails, allowing more accessories to be mounted. It uses plastic components where possible instead of wood or metal, with such components being the pistol grip, handguards, folding stock and depending on the type, the magazine.

Protective coatings for corrosion resistance of metal parts. Forearm, magazine, butt stock and pistol grip are made of high strength shatterproof plastic.

The AK-104 is a compact version of the AK-103. It has a muzzle brake derived from the older AKS-74U combined with a shorter barrel. It is chambered for 7.62×39mm ammunition.

Magazines

The current issue steel-reinforced matte true black nonreflective surface finished 7.62×39mm 30-round magazines, fabricated from ABS plastic weigh  empty.

The transition from steel to mainly plastic magazines yielded a significant weight reduction and allow a soldier to carry more rounds for the same weight.

Note: All, 7.62×39mm AK magazines are backwards compatible with older AK variants.Note *: 10.12 kg (22.3 lb) is the maximum amount of ammo that the average soldier can comfortably carry. It also allows for best comparison of the three most common 7.62×39mm AK platform magazines.

Variants
The semi-automatic only variant of the AK-103 is designated the AK-103-1, and the three round burst is designated the AK-103-2.

STL-1A
A Vietnamese version known as the STL-1A is made by Factory Z111 and is used by the People's Army of Vietnam. Another modernized version called the STL-1B is currently planned. It first appeared in the 2018 Indo Defence Expo & Forum.

KR-103
The KR-103 is a semi-automatic clone of the AK-103 made by Kalashnikov USA.

Users

 : Used by the Parachute Commando Regiments
 : The licensed production of the AK-103 started in July 2020.
 : The Gafat Armament Engineering Complex produces the AK-103 rifle in Ethiopia. Supplements the AKM and AK-47 in the Ethiopian Armed Forces. It was reported in 2014 that the deal didn't go through at all.
 : The sale of an undisclosed number of AK-103s for use by sections of the Iranian special forces and marines and use by Islamic Revolutionary Guard Corps special forces. The IRGC is reported to be using the AK-103.
 : Seen in the hands of anti-Gaddafi forces and loyalists in numerous photos. The rifles in use are the AK-103-2 version.
 : Used by Namibian Marine Corps
: Unlicensed Clone "PK-21" in production by Pakistan Ordnance Factories.
: Used by the Izz ad-Din al-Qassam Brigades.
: Used by Spetsnaz GRU and Ministry of Internal Affairs.
 : A license to produce AK-103 rifles was granted to Saudi Arabia in 2017.
 : First 30,000 AK-103 rifles were received in June 2006. Made under license by CAVIM with initial licensing fee payments made in 2006 and the transfer of Russian-made AK-103s to Venezuela in 2008. CAVIM's AK-103 factories opened officially in 2012 without the necessary manufacturing equipment. CAVIM-made AK-103s were delivered to the Venezuelan Army in 2013. Due to trouble with the plant with the Russian contractor failing to meet deadlines with a case of fraud, which forced CAVIM to finish the rest of the construction, full-scale production started by 2019.
 : 500 AK-103s for the Uruguayan National Guard.

Non-state actors
  Guardians of Religion Organization
 MUJAO used an ex-Libyan AK-103-2 in Agadez and Arlit attacks in 2013.

Gallery

References

External links

 Modern Firearms - AK-103
 Kalashnikov.guns.ru
 Izhmash page on the AK-103

7.62×39mm assault rifles
Kalashnikov derivatives
Assault rifles of Russia
Kalashnikov Concern products
Weapons and ammunition introduced in 1993

ru:АК-103